Tepeköy is a town in Mersin Province, Turkey. It's part of Mezitli district (which is an intracity district within Greater Mersin). The main road is to another town Fındıkpınarı to east. The population of the town was 2019 as of 2018.

The village was founded by Turkmens. In 1994 it was declared a township.

References

Populated places in Mersin Province
Towns in Turkey
Populated places in Mezitli District